Growee River, a perennial river of the Hunter River catchment, is located in the Central Tablelands region of New South Wales, Australia.

Course and features
Growee River rises on the northern slopes of the Great Dividing Range, below Hefrons Hole, northeast of Rylstone and flows generally northwest then north northeast, then north by west then northeast, joined by three minor tributaries before reaching its confluence with the Bylong River near Bylong. The river descends  over its  course.

The Bylong Valley Way crosses the Growee River at multiple points from below Growee Mountain in the south to near the town of Bylong in the north.

See also

 Rivers of New South Wales
 List of rivers of New South Wales (A–K)
 List of rivers of Australia

References

External links
 

Rivers of New South Wales
Central Tablelands